Nnedimma Nkemdili "Nnedi" Okorafor (formerly Okorafor-Mbachu;  born April 8, 1974) is a Nigerian-American writer of science fiction and fantasy for both children and adults. She is best known for her Binti Series and her novels Who Fears Death, Zahrah the Windseeker, Akata Witch, Akata Warrior, Lagoon and Remote Control. She has also written for comics and film.

Her writing is Africanfuturism and Africanjujuism, which is heavily influenced by her dual Nigerian and American heritage. She is the recipient of multiple awards, including the Hugo Award, Nebula Award, Eisner Award and World Fantasy Award. She is considered to be among the third generation of Nigerian writers.

Background and personal life 
Nnedimma Nkemdili Okorafor was born in Cincinnati, Ohio, in 1974 to Igbo Nigerian parents who travelled to America in 1969 to attend school  but purportedly could not return to Nigeria due to the Nigerian Civil War. 

Okorafor is the third child in a family of four children and grew up in Chicago, Illinois, and would often travel to Nigeria to spend her holidays with her extended family. Her first name is Igbo for "mother is good".

During her years attending Homewood-Flossmoor High School in Flossmoor, Illinois, Okorafor was a nationally known tennis and track star and excelled in math and the sciences. Due to her interest in insects, she desired to be an entomologist.

She was diagnosed with scoliosis at the age of 13, a condition that worsened as she grew older. At age 19, she underwent spinal fusion surgery to straighten and fuse her spine; a rare complication led to Okorafor becoming paralyzed from the waist down.

Okorafor turned to writing small stories in the margins of a science-fiction book that she had. It was the first time she had ever written anything creatively. That summer, with intense physical therapy, Okorafor regained her ability to walk with a cane, but she was unable to continue her athletic career. At the suggestion of a close friend, she took a creative writing class that spring semester and was writing her first novel by the semester's end.

She completed her college education at the University of Illinois at Urbana-Champaign, before obtaining a master's degree in journalism from Michigan State University and a master's degree and PhD in English from the University of Illinois, Chicago. She is a 2001 graduate of the Clarion Writers Workshop in Lansing, Michigan. She currently lives in Arizona with her family.

Work

Short stories 
Okorafor received a 2001 Hurston-Wright literary award for her story "Amphibious Green". Okorafor's short stories have been published in anthologies and magazines, including Dark Matter: Reading The Bones, Enkare Review, Strange Horizons, Moondance magazine, and Writers of the Future Volume XVIII. A collection of her stories, titled Kabu Kabu, was published by Prime Books in 2013. It includes the titular piece, co-authored by Alan Dean Foster, six other previously unpublished short stories, and 14 stories that had been previously published in other venues since 2001; with a foreword by Whoopi Goldberg.

Novels and novellas
After her 2001 Hurston-Wright award, she published two acclaimed books for young adults, The Shadow Speaker (Hyperion/Disney Book Group) and Zahrah the Windseeker (Houghton Mifflin Harcourt). The Shadow Speaker was a winner of the Carl Brandon Parallax Award, a Booksense Pick for Winter 2007/2008, a Tiptree Honor Book, a finalist for the Essence Magazine Literary Award, the Andre Norton Award and the Golden Duck Award, and an NAACP Image Award nominee. Her children's book, Long Juju Man, was the 2007–08 winner of the Macmillan Writer's Prize for Africa.

Okorafor's first adult novel, Who Fears Death (DAW/Penguin Books), won the 2011 World Fantasy Award for Best Novel, was nominated for the 2010 Nebula Award. The prequel The Book of Phoenix won the 2018 Kurd Laßwitz Preis and was a finalist for the Arthur C. Clarke Award.

In 2011, she returned to young adult with Akata Witch (Viking/Penguin), the first book in the Nsibidi Scripts Series, which was a Junior Library Guild Selection. The sequel, Akata Warrior, went on to win the 2018 Locus Award for Best Young Adult Book.

Okorafor's science fiction novel Lagoon was a finalist for a British Science Fiction Association Award (Best Novel), a Red Tentacle Award (Best Novel), and a Tiptree Honor Book.

The Binti trilogy began with the 2015 novella, Binti. This was followed by Binti: Home, published in 2017, and Binti: The Night Masquerade, published in 2018. Binti won both the 2016 Nebula Award and 2016 Hugo Award for best novella, and was a finalist for a British Science Fiction Association Award (Best Short) and BooktubeSFF Award (Best Short Work). Binti: Home and Binti: The Night Masquerade both received Hugo nominations for best novella in 2018 and 2019, respectively.

Also in 2016, the United Bank for Africa, a Nigerian bank, partnered with Cassava Republic Press to distribute 24,000 copies of Okorafor's novel Akata Witch in nine African countries.

In 2020, Okorafor released her middle grade novel Ikenga, which was nominated for the Edgar Award.

Okorafor's science fiction novella Remote Control, set in a near future Ghana, was published in January 2021. Her adult novel Noor, set in a futurist northern Nigeria, was released in November 2021.

In January 2022, Okorafor's Akata Woman, the third novel in the Nsibidi Scripts Series, was released. Following the release of the novel, the series debuted on The New York Times Best Seller list.

In 2023, Okorafor announced her novella trilogy She Who Knows which would serve as a prequel and sequel to her 2010 novel Who Fears Death and would focus on the life of Najeeba, Onyesonwu's mother. The first novella is scheduled for publication in 2024.

Adaptations 
In February 2017, Okorafor announced via Facebook that her science-meets-witchcraft short story "Hello, Moto" had been optioned by Nigerian production company Fiery Film. The story was adapted into a short film, titled Hello, Rain by filmmaker C. J. Obasi. The story tells the tale of a woman who discovers that she can merge witchcraft and technology when she creates wigs for herself and her friends that allow them to wield influence and power, to help battle corruption. Instead, she watches her friends themselves become corrupted. A teaser was released in January 2018. Hello, Rain had its world premiere at the International Short Film Festival Oberhausen on May 6, 2018.

In July 2017, Okorafor announced via Twitter that Who Fears Death had been picked up by HBO to become a television series, with novelist and Game of Thrones producer George R. R. Martin joining the project as an executive producer. Okorafor will remain involved with the project as a consultant. In January 2021, it was announced that Tessa Thompson's newly formed production company, Viva Maude, had joined the team.

In April 2019, it was announced that Okorafor would co-write the screenplay of an adaptation of Octavia Butler's Wild Seed with filmmaker Wanuri Kahiu for Amazon Prime Video and reportedly  will be produced by Viola Davis.

In January 2020, it was announced that Okorafor would co-write the screenplay of an adaptation of her Binti trilogy for Hulu with writer Stacy Osei-Kuffour.

Other work
In 2005, Okorafor wrote and published her first play, Full Moon. The Buxville Theater Company in Chicago helped produce this full-length theatrical work.

In 2009, Okorafor donated her archive to the Science Fiction and Fantasy Writers of America (SFWA) Collection of the Department of Rare Books and Special Collections at the Northern Illinois University Library.

Okorafor was the Young Adult Author special Guest of Honor at Detcon1, the 2014 North American Science Fiction Convention; Detcon1 was putting special emphasis on YA science fiction.

She spoke at the TEDGlobal conference in Arusha, Tanzania, in August 2017.

In October 2017, Okorafor announced via Twitter she would be writing three issues for Marvel's Black Panther comic, picking up where author Ta-Nehisi Coates left off. The first issue of Black Panther: Long Live the King was released in December 2017. A month earlier, a short comic of hers titled "Blessing in Disguise" was included in Marvel's Venomverse War Stories No. 1, inspired by the 2014 Boko Haram kidnapping of more than 200 Nigerian girls. In March 2017, it was announced that she would return to writing derived from the Black Panther, in Wakanda Forever, where the Dora Milaje team-up with Spider-Man, the X-Men and the Avengers. In July 2018, it announced that Okorafor would write a solo title focused on Black Panther's sister, Shuri.

Broken Places & Outer Spaces, Okorafor's first non-fiction title, was published by Simon & Schuster in 2019.

Okorafor contributed the essay "Zula of the fourth-grade playground" to the 2019 anthology New Daughters of Africa, edited by Margaret Busby.

In 2018, her comic book limited series LaGuardia was published by Berger Books. In 2020, the collected trade won an Eisner Award and a Hugo Award.

Influences and themes 
Okorafor's novels and stories reflect both her West African heritage and her American life. Rather than identifying as Nigerian-American, she refers to herself as "Naijamerican" and explains the importance of her dual heritage during a 2016 NPR interview: That's very much a part of my identity, and it's also very much a reason why I think I ended up writing science fiction and fantasy because I live on these borders – and these borders that allow me to see from multiple perspectives and kind of take things in and then kind of process certain ideas and certain stories in a very unique way. And that has led me to write this strange fiction that I write, which really isn't that strange if you really look at it through a sort of skewed lens.  Okorafor noticed how the fantasy and science fiction genre contain little diversity, and that was her motivation for writing books of these genres set in Africa. She wanted to include more people of color and create stories with Africa as the setting because so few stories were set there. She wrote her first story as a college sophomore and made the setting of her story Nigeria. Her stories place black girls in important roles that are usually given to white characters. Okorafor cites Nigeria as "her muse" as she is heavily influenced by Nigerian folklore and its rich mythology and mysticism.

Gary K. Wolfe wrote of her work: "Okorafor's genius has been to find the iconic images and traditions of African culture, mostly Nigerian and often Igbo, and tweak them just enough to become a seamless part of her vocabulary of fantastika."

Her work often looks at "weighty social issues: racial and gender inequality, political violence, the destruction of the environment, genocide and corruption" through "the framework of fantasy".

Okorafor shares that while the themes of her stories are often multi-layered they are always grounded in "stories of the women and girls around me and also within myself".

Okorafor asserts that her work and parental responsibility relate to each other because "writing and being a mother are a part of me, so they are mixed together and balance each other out."

As of 2019, she began strongly rejecting the term "afrofuturism" as a label for her work and coined the terms africanfuturism and africanjujuism instead. In October 2019, she published an essay titled "Defining Africanfuturism" that defines both terms in detail.

World Fantasy Award
Shortly after winning the World Fantasy Award in 2011, Okorafor published an essay "Lovecraft's racism & The World Fantasy Award statuette, with comments from China Miéville", in which she reflected upon her conflicting emotions on winning an award in the shape of a large silver bust of H. P. Lovecraft. She would later voice her support for Daniel José Older's 2014 petition to replace the Lovecraft bust with one of Octavia Butler. In the essay, she acknowledges both the literary legacy of Lovecraft and his continued influence in the contemporary world of science fiction:Do I want "The Howard" (the nickname for the World Fantasy Award statuette. Lovecraft's full name is "Howard Phillips Lovecraft") replaced with the head of some other great writer? Maybe. Maybe it's about that time. Maybe not. What I know I want is to face the history of this leg of literature rather than put it aside or bury it. If this is how some of the great minds of speculative fiction felt, then let's deal with that ... as opposed to never mention it or explain it away.

Awards

Novel and Novellas

Comics

Short fiction, memoir and Novelette

Other Awards
 2005 – The Strange Horizons Reader's Choice Award for Stephen King's Super-Duper Magical Negroes
 2007–2008 – Macmillan Writers' Prize for Africa for Long Juju Man
 2008 – Wole Soyinka Prize for Literature in Africa for Zahrah the Windseeker
 2012 – Black Excellence Award for Outstanding Achievement in Literature (Fiction) for Zahrah the Windseeker
 2015 – African Literary Person of the Year from Brittle Paper
 2016 – Children's Africana Book Award for Best Book for Young Readers for Chicken in the Kitchen
Mathical Honors for Binti

Bibliography 
Children
 Long Juju Man (2009, Macmillan Africa)
 Iridessa and the Secret of the Never Mine (2012, Disney Books)
Chicken in the Kitchen (2020, Lantana publishing)

Young adult
 Zahrah the Windseeker (2005, Houghton Mifflin Harcourt; paperback 2008, Graphia/Houghton Mifflin Harcourt)—writing as Nnedi Okorafor-Mbachu
 The Shadow Speaker (2007, Hyperion/Disney)—writing as Nnedi Okorafor-Mbachu
 Akata Witch (2011, Viking/Penguin) (published as What Sunny Saw in the Flames in Nigeria and the UK by Cassava Republic Press)
 Akata Warrior (2017, Viking/Penguin/PRH) (published as Sunny and the Mysteries of Osisi in Nigeria and the UK by Cassava Republic Press)
 Ikenga (2020, Viking/Penguin)
Akata Woman (2022, Viking/Penguin)

Adult
 Who Fears Death (2010, DAW/Penguin)
 "Hello, Moto" (2011, Tor.com)
 "Moom!" short story in "AfroSF: Science Fiction by African Writers" (2012, Storytime)
 Kabu Kabu (2013, Prime Books)
 "It's War" short story in "Long Hidden: Speculative Fiction from the Margins of History" (2014, Crossed Genres)
 Lagoon (2014, Hodder & Stoughton Ltd.) (2015, Saga Press/Simon & Schuster)
 The Book of Phoenix (2015, DAW/Penguin/PRH) (prequel of Who Fears Death)
 Binti (2015, Tor.com)
 Binti: Home (2017, Tor.com)
Binti: The Night Masquerade (2018, Tor.com)
Broken Places & Outer Spaces: Finding Creativity in the Unexpected (TED Books) (2019, Simon & Schuster/ TED)
 "Sunrise" short story in Africanfuturism: An Anthology (2020, Brittle Paper)Remote Control (2021, Tor.com)
 Noor (2021, DAW/Penguin/PRH) She Who Knows trilogy (2024, DAW) 

Comics
 Black Panther: Long Live the King (2017, Marvel)
 LaGuardia (2018, Dark Horse)
 Shuri (2018, Marvel)
 Wakanda Forever (2018, Marvel)
 Antar: the Black Knight (2018, IDW/Mirage Films)
 Shuri: Wakanda Forever (2020, Marvel)
 After The Rain (2021, Abrams ComicArts – Megascope)

 Selected filmography 
 Brave New Souls: Black Sci-Fi & Fantasy Writers of the 21st Century (2013) – Herself

 References 

 External links 

Nnedi Okorafor Home Page
Africanfuturism Defined by Nnedi Okorafor
Mikki Kendall, "A Nigerian Sorceress Makes Her Way", Publishers Weekly, April 12, 2010
Nebula Awards Guest Blog: Is Africa Ready for Science Fiction by Nnedi Okorafor
Review of Zahrah the Windseeker by Gary K. Wolfe
"Stephen King's Super-Duper Magical Negroes" by Okorafor-Mbachu
"From the Lost Diary of TreeFrog7" (short story), Clarkesworld Magazine, May 2009
Stories by Okorafor at AfricanWriter.com
"If It Scares You, Write It: A Conversation with Nnedi Okorafor" (interview), Clarkesworld Magazine'', December 2009

2010 Audio Interview on the Geek's Guide to the Galaxy Podcast
"Sci-fi stories that imagine a future Africa". Nnedi Okorafor at TEDGlobal 2017

1974 births
Living people
21st-century American novelists
21st-century American women writers
American children's writers
American comics creators
American fantasy writers
American people of Igbo descent
American science fiction writers
American women novelists
American women children's writers
American writers of African descent
African-American comics creators
Black speculative fiction authors
Female comics writers
Homewood-Flossmoor High School alumni
Hugo Award-winning writers
Igbo novelists
Igbo women writers
Marvel Comics writers
Nebula Award winners
Nigerian children's writers
Nigerian fantasy writers
Nigerian science fiction writers
Nigerian speculative fiction writers
Nigerian women children's writers
Nigerian women writers
Nommo Award winners
Novelists from Ohio
People from Olympia Fields, Illinois
Women science fiction and fantasy writers
World Fantasy Award-winning writers
Writers from Cincinnati
 Nigerian feminists